This is a list of yeshivas, midrashas, and Hebrew schools in Israel and the West Bank.

In Orthodox Judaism a yeshiva (Hebrew: ישיבה) is an educational institution where men can study the Torah, the Talmud, and develop their character. A yeshiva usually is led by a rabbi called a rosh yeshiva (head of the yeshiva). A midrasha (Hebrew: מדרשה) or seminary is an equivalent educational institution for Jewish women. In Conservative Judaism and Reform Judaism,  men and women study together at yeshivas.

Yeshivas

 Yeshiva Ohr Yerushalayim
 Yeshiva Heichal Eliahu
 HaYeshiva HaGehova Hebrew
 Heichal HaTorah Tzion
 Jerusalem College of Technology
 Maale Efraim Hesder Yeshiva
 Machon Benayah Yeshiva
 Merkaz Herzog Center
 Yeshiva Ateret Cohanim
 Yeshiva Ayelet of Eilat
 Yeshiva Bat Ayin
 Yeshiva Toras Chaim
 Yeshiva Mercaz Hatorah
 Ohr Yerushalaim
 Mesivta Adams D'Darnold
 Yeshiva Chofetz Chaim
 Yeshiva Beit Orot
 Yeshivat Beit Nochum – Telz Stone
  Yeshivat Ligh Tweit Lev – Beit Meir
  Mesivta Starkmann De’Gunzz
 Yeshiva Bnei Akiva
 Yeshiva Chemdat Yehuda
 Yeshiva Darkhei Torah
 Yeshiva Gedolah Ramat Shlomo
 Yeshivat Har Etzion
 Yeshiva Hadras Yerushalayim
 Yeshiva HaGolan
 Yeshiva Har Hamor
 Yeshiva Hesder Akko
 Yeshiva Hesder Holon
 Yeshiva Hesder Karnei Shomron
 Yeshiva Hesder Nahariya
 Yeshiva Hesder Maale Efraim
 Yeshiva Hesder Sderot
 Yeshiva Hesder Ramat Gan
 Yeshivas Itri
 Yeshiva Kefar HaRoe
 Yeshiva Kehillat Yaakov
 Yeshiva Kyriat Malachi
 Yeshiva Kyriat Moshe
 Yeshiva Maale Gilboa Hebrew
 Yeshiva Ma'alot
 Yeshivat Mercaz HaRav
 Yeshiva Ner Yaakov
 Yeshiva Neve Aretz
 Yeshiva Neve Dekalim
 Yeshiva Ohr Elchonon
 Yeshiva Or Tzion Hebrew
 Yeshiva Or Vishua Hebrew
 Yeshiva Otniel Hebrew
 Yeshiva Petach Tikva
 Yeshiva Rehovot
 Yeshiva Rishon Le Tzion
 Yeshivas Reishis Yerushalayim
 Yeshiva Shaalvim Hebrew
 Yeshiva Shalom Rav
 Yeshiva Tekoa Hebrew
 Yeshiva Torah Nachal
 Yeshiva Torah Manhiga
 Yeshiva Torah Shraga
 Yeshiva Tzurba Merabanan
 Mechina Beit Israel
 Mechina Chemdat Yehuda
 Mechina Echannaton
 Mechina Elisha
 Mechina Yeud
 Nahal Haredi Netzah Yehuda
 Nachal Novea Kollel Tzfat
 Neveh Tzion
 Ohr Somayach, Jerusalem
 Pardes Institute of Jewish Studies
 Schechter Jewish Institute
 Tiferes Zvi Institutions
 Torah L'Maaseh
 The Tzomet Institute
 Yeshiva Ateret Yerushalayim
 Yeshiva Bais Yisroel
 Yeshiva Beit Horot Har HaZeitim
 Yeshiva Beit Yosef English
 Yeshiva Birkat Moshe English
 Yeshiva Breslev, Bnei Brak
 Yeshiva Chabad of Tzfat
 Yeshiva Charnobyl English
 Yeshiva Chazon Nahum
 Yeshiva Derech HaTalmud
 Yeshiva Dvar Yerushalayim
 Yeshiva Eretz HaTzvi
 Yeshiva HaKotel
 Yeshiva Har Bracha
 Yeshiva Heichal HaTorah
 Yeshiva High School of Sussya
 Yeshiva Kaf HaHaim
 Yeshiva Kiryat Shemona
 Yeshiva Lev Aharon
 Yeshiva Lev Aryeh
 Yeshiva Lev HaTorah
 Yeshiva Lomdei Torah
 Yeshiva Maale Gilboa English
 Yeshiva Maalot English
 Yeshiva Marbeh Torah
 Yeshiva Midrash Shmuel
 Yeshiva Migdal HaTorah
 Yeshiva Nesivos Ahron
 Yeshiva Netiv Aryeh
 Yeshiva Netivot Chaim, Bnai Brak
 Yeshiva Or Avraham
 Yeshiva Or David
 Yeshiva Or Tmimim
 Yeshiva Or Tzion English
 Yeshiva Or Vishua English
 Yeshiva Or Yerushalaym
 Yeshiva Otniel English
 Yeshiva Petah Tikvah English
 Yeshiva Reishit Center
 Yeshiva Ruach Chaim
 Yeshiva Shaalvim English
 Yeshiva Shaare Chaim
 Yeshiva Sha'arei Mevaseret Zion
 Yeshiva Shalom Rav
 Yeshiva Shalom Tzat
 Yeshiva Shaavei Hevron
 Yeshiva Simchat Shlomo
 Yeshiva Sulam Yaakov
 Yeshiva Tekoa English
 Yeshiva Temimei Derech
 Yeshiva Tiferet Yerushalayim
 Yeshiva Tiferes Chaim
 Yeshiva Toras Emes Chabad Lubavitch
 Yeshiva Torat Shraga
 Yeshiva Torat Yosef
 Yeshiva Tzeirei Hashluchim Tzfat (Chabad)
 Yeshiva Yashlatz
 Yeshiva Yesod Hatorah
 Yeshiva Yesodei Hatorah
 Yeshiva Yishrei Lev
 Yeshiva Zeev HaTorah
 Yeshiva Zichron Dovid

Hesder Yeshivas 
 Har Hamor
 Maale Efraim Hesder Yeshiva
 Meir Harel Hesder Yeshiva
 Mercaz HaRav
 Yeshivat Birkat Moshe
 Yeshivat Eretz HaTzvi
 Yeshivat HaHesder Yerucham
 Yeshivat HaKotel
 Yeshivat Har Bracha
 Yeshivat Har Etzion
 Yeshivat Hesder Elon Moreh
 Yeshivat Hesder Petah Tikva
 Yeshiva Hesder Sderot
 Yeshiva Hesder Tefahot
 Yeshiva Hesder Yerucham
 Yeshivat Kerem B'Yavneh
 Yeshivat Ma'alot
 Yeshivat Or Etzion
 Yeshivat Or Vishua
 Yeshivat Otniel
 Yeshivat Sha'alvim
 Yeshivat Shilo

Yeshivas in Bnei Brak 
 Ponevezh Yeshiva
 Kollel Chazon Ish
 Marbeh Torah
 Ponevezh Yeshiva
 Slabodka yeshiva (Bnei Brak)

Yeshivas in Jerusalem 
 Aish HaTorah
 Ateret Cohanim
 Bais Hatalmud
 Beit El Synagogue
 Beth Jacob Jerusalem
 Bircas HaTorah
 Derech Etz Chaim
 Diaspora Yeshiva
 Dvar Yerushalayim
 Conservative Yeshiva
 Yeshivat Eretz HaTzvi
 Eretz Hemdah Institute
 Etz Chaim Yeshiva
 Fuchsberg Center
 Yeshivat HaKotel
 Har Hamor
 Harry Fischel Institute for Talmudic Research
 Hebrew Union College-Jewish Institute of Religion
 Keser Torah Radomsk
 Kol Torah
 Lakewood East
 Machon Meir
 Machon Shlomo – The Heiden Institute
 Machon Yaakov
 Mayanot
 Meah Shearim Yeshiva and Talmud Torah
 Medrash Chaim
 Mercaz HaRav
 Mercaz Hatorah
 Midrash Shmuel Yeshiva
 Mir Yeshiva (Jerusalem)
 Ohr Somayach, Jerusalem
 Yeshiva Pachad Yitzchok
 Porat Yosef Yeshiva
 Pressburg Yeshiva (Jerusalem)
 Sfas Emes Yeshiva
 Shaar Hashamayim Yeshiva
 Shapell's Darche Noam
 Shuvu Bonim
 Torah Ore
 Torah Tech
 Toras Emes Chabad Lubavitch
 Yeshiva Aderes HaTorah
 Yeshiva Toras Moshe
 Yashlatz
 Yeshiva Ohr Elchonon (Jerusalem)
 Yeshivas Bais Yisroel
 Yeshivas Itri
 Yeshiva Knesset Avraham
 Yeshivat Aderet Eliyahu
 Yeshivat Netiv Aryeh
 Yeshivat Ohr David
 Yeshivat Torat Shraga
 Yeshivas Tiferes Yisroel Chaim
* [[Yeshiva Torah V'Avodah]]

Yeshivas in the West Bank
 Beit El yeshiva
 Migdal Oz (seminary)
 Mir Brachfeld
 Od Yosef Chai
 Yeshivat Birkat Moshe
 Yeshivat HaMivtar
 Yeshivat Har Bracha
 Yeshivat Har Etzion

Zionist yeshivas 
 Ahavat Israel Hesder Yeshiva
 Yeshivat Lev Hatorah
 Yeshivat Torat HaChaim

Mechinas 
 Mechina Bnei David Eli
 Mechina Keshet Yehuda
 Mechina Kyriat Malachi
 Mechina Magen Shaul
 Mechina Maayan Baruch
 Mechina Nachshon Negev
 Mechina Kol Ami

Midrashas

 Ayelet Hashajar
 Beth Jacob Jerusalem
 Binas Bais Yaakov Seminary
 Bnos Avigail
 Bnos Batsheva
 Bnos Chava
 Bnos Sarah
 EYAHT
 Havineini Bais Yaakov Seminary 
 Machon Bnos Yehuda (BYA)
 Machon Gold
 Machon Ora
 Machon Raaya
 Midreshet Aviv
 Midreshet Binat
 Midreshet HaRova
 Midreshet Lindenbaum
 Midreshet Ma'amakim
  Midreshet Senters
 Midreshet Rachel v’Chaya
 Migdal Oz (seminary)
 Neve Yerushalayim
 Baer Miriam Center
 Beit Chana, Tzfat
 Beit Midrash Migdal Oz
 Beth Oloth, Jerusalem
 Beth Jacob Jerusalem
 Bnos Chana, Beit Shemesh
 Bnot Torah Institute, Jerusalem
 Emunah College of Education
 Emunah Torah Art
 Eshel Sephardic Women's Seminary
 Eyaht College for Women
 Igud HaMidrashot
 Midrasha Shirat Devora
 Neve Hadassah for Women
 Neve Yerushalaym College
 Nishmat, Jewish Center for Women
 Maatan HaSharon
 Machal Michlalah
 Machon Alte Chabad
 Machon Maayan Program
 Mayanot Women's Learning Program 
 Machon Roni , Jerusalem
 Machon Shoshanat Yerushalaym
 Machon Tal, Givat Shaul, Jerusalem
 Maayanot Sem
 Michlelet Mevaseret Yerushalaym
 Midrasha for Advanced Torah Studies, Bar-Ilan University 
 Midrasha Efrata
 Midrasha Michlalah
 Midrasha Talpiot
 Midreshet Akko
 Midreshet Amit
 Midreshet Aviv
 Midreshet Shirat Hevron
 Midreshet Bat Tzion
 Midreshet Berot Bat Ayin
 Midreshet Binat
 Midreshet Devora Center
 Midreshet Ein Ha Natziv 
 Midreshet Emunah
 Midreshet HaRova
 Midreshet Hebron
 Midreshet Moriah
 Midreshet Lindenbaum
 Midreshet Rachel Shapell's
 Midreshet Shuva
 Midreshet Tel Hai
 Midreshet Tehilla, Yerushalaym
 Midreshet Tzvia, Yerushalaym
 Midreshet Yeud, Jerusalem
 Ohr Chaya Center, Jerusalem
 Orot HaGalil College
 Pelech School Jerusalem
 Pninim Kiryat Moshe
 Shaanan Academic Religious Teachers' College
 Sharei Bina Women's Center
 Shalvim Midrasha for Women
 Shearim College for Women
 Shoshanat Yerushalaym
 Tiferet Center Beit Shemesh
 Tomer Devorah Seminary
 Torah Academy for Girls
 Torah Reva Yerushalaym

Israeli Hebrew schools
 Ace Academic Center
 Beit Margalit Hebrew School
 Democratic School of Hadera
 Keren HaYeled Hebrew School
 Kindergarten Gan Yehudit
 Nachal Novea Mekor Chochma
 Neve Shmuel Boys High School
 Makor Ha Tikvah Hebrew School
 Shalom Hartman Hebrew School
 Shvut Rachel Hebrew School
 Talmud Torah Magen Avot
 Talmud Torah Pinsk Karlin
 Talmud Torah Rav Pealim
 Talmud Torah Torat Olam
 Talmud Torah Yakov Yosef
 Talmud Torah Ziv HaTorah
 Torah Academy of Jerusalem
 Yeshiva Ketana Kiryat Breslev

See also
 List of Jewish communities by country
 List of Israeli universities and colleges
 List of synagogues in Israel
 List of synagogues in the United States
 List of Jewish communities in North America
 List of Jewish communities in the United Kingdom
 Structure and internal organization of the Israel Army

Israel religion-related lists
Yeshivas
Israel
Yeshivas, midrashas and Hebrew schools in Israel
Midrashim